This is a list of species in the genus Ptecticus.

Ptecticus species

References

Ptecticus
Diptera of North America
Diptera of South America
Diptera of Asia
Diptera of Africa
Diptera of Australasia